Eubela nipponica is a species of sea snail, a marine gastropod mollusk in the family Raphitomidae.

Description

Distribution
This marine species occurs off Japan.

References

 Powell, A. W. B., 1966. The molluscan families Speightiidae and Turridae, an evaluation of the valid taxa, both Recent and fossil, with list of characteristic species. Bulletin of the Auckland Institute and Museum, 5:1-184

External links
 Biolib.cz: original image
 Gastropods.com: Eubela nipponica
 

nipponica
Gastropods described in 1938